SR556 may refer to:

 Ruger SR-556, a firearm
 State Road or Route 556